Keysville may refer to a location in the United States:

Keysville, California, former name of Keyesville, California
Keysville, Florida
Keysville, Georgia
Keysville, Missouri
Keysville, Maryland
Keysville, Virginia